Marco Polo ( is a form of tag played in a swimming pool.

Rules
One player is chosen as "it". That player, with closed eyes, tries to find and tag any one of the other players, relying on hearing to find someone to tag. The player who is "it" shouts "Marco" and the other players must all respond by shouting "Polo", which the "it" player uses to try to find them. If a player is tagged, then that player becomes "it". If "it" suspects that a player has left the pool, they can shout, "fish out of water!" and the player who is out of the pool becomes the new "it".

The game can also be played on land, with slightly modified rules. It is similar to blind man's buff, where one person is blindfolded while others choose hiding places around the room. While playing one cannot hold another player in place to be tagged or that person is it.

History
The game shares its name with the 13th-century Italian trader and explorer Marco Polo.

There does not appear to be any real connection between the game and the explorer of the same name, although according to one whimsical explanation, "legend has it that the famed explorer didn't really have a clue as to where he was going", this being reflected in the "it" player's behavior. Although water polo is another popular pool game, the name of "Marco Polo" is apparently unrelated.

The game shares similar traits with blind man's bluff, an essentially identical game played on dry land which dates back to at least the 16th century. Marco Polo was known as a water game in America by the 1960s. Between 1965 and 1970, some respondents to a Dictionary of American Regional English survey, when asked to name a game played in the water, responded with "Marco Polo". By the mid-1970s, the game had spread and become very popular in swimming pools frequented by expatriates living in Hong Kong. It did not reach swimming pools in the United Kingdom until later, likely from British children returning from Hong Kong for their studies.

In modern times, Marco Polo is played worldwide. Various regions have their own versions of the game, with names such as Mermaid on the Rocks and Alligator. The term "Marco Polo game" is sometimes used to describe an online game where a similar call-and-response system of gameplay is adopted.

Analysis
Marco Polo is an "easily modifiable game", and is based on the notion of call-and-response. Marco Polo is a location-based game because players are confined to a set space and because players must locate each other using auditory clues. Encyclopedia of Play in Today's Society argues "there is bipolarity in the reversal of roles...there are repeated actions, a routine to be repeated, rules to be observed, and verbal signs to be used". Playing this game can allow children to experiment with different social roles, for example learning what it means to be an outcast in the role of "it" (isolated, confined to a space, and unable to see others). According to the Nevada Regional Medical Center, "Marco Polo is not only fun, it can be a good workout. It also puts less stress on your bones and joints because the water makes your body float."

References

Hide-and-seek variants
Swimming pool games
Tag variants
Cultural depictions of Marco Polo
Children's games